The Jerome Elementary School No. 22 is a historic school building on North Louisiana Boulevard in Jerome, Arkansas.  The single story brick building was constructed in 1930, at a time when Jerome was a thriving logging and farming town.  It was used as a school until 1950, when Jerome's schools were consolidated with nearby Dermott.  It sat vacant and deteriorating until it was sold in 1970 to a citizens' group, which rehabilitated the building for other civic purposes.

The building was listed on the National Register of Historic Places in 2005.

See also
National Register of Historic Places listings in Drew County, Arkansas

References

School buildings on the National Register of Historic Places in Arkansas
School buildings completed in 1930
Buildings and structures in Drew County, Arkansas
National Register of Historic Places in Drew County, Arkansas
1930 establishments in Arkansas